Chasing the Ghost is the fourth studio album by Collide, released on October 31, 2000 by Noiseplus Music.

Reception
Side-Line Magazine said "this is an ethereal, emotive disc that crosses the cold fire of early Siouxsie with the warm urgency of modern trip hop, yet wholly manages to defy categorization."

Track listing

Personnel
Adapted from the Chasing the Ghost liner notes.

Collide
 Eric Anest (as Statik) – noises, production, engineering, mixing, photography, design
 Karin Johnston (as Tripp9) – vocals, photography, design

Production and design
 Chris Bellman – mastering
 Dan Santoni – photography
 Gary Silva – photography
 Pierre Silva – photography
 Chad Michael Ward – cover art, illustrations, design

Release history

References

External links 
 Chasing the Ghost at collide.net
 
 Chasing the Ghost at Bandcamp
 Chasing the Ghost at iTunes

Collide (band) albums
2000 albums
Re-Constriction Records albums